Skif Paragliding is a Ukrainian aircraft manufacturer founded by Sergei Rozhko in 1993 and based in Feodosia. The company specializes in the design and manufacture of paragliders in the form of ready-to-fly aircraft and also runs a paragliding flight training school.

Rozhko is also the designer of the company's paraglider line.

The company flight training operation takes place on Klementyeva Mountain.

By 2003 the company was offering a line of paragliders, including the beginner to intermediate Skif-A, the competition Raptor and the two-place BigSkif Bi for flight training.

Aircraft 
Summary of aircraft built by Skif Paragliding:
Skif BigSkif Bi
Skif Phaeton
Skif Raptor
Skif Sarmat
Skif Skif-A

References

External links

Aircraft manufacturers of Ukraine
Paragliders
Manufacturing companies established in 1993
Ukrainian companies established in 1993
Feodosia Municipality